Thomas G. Reynolds (born December 16, 1956) is a former American politician who served in the Wisconsin State Senate, representing the 5th district. He is a former member of the Republican Party of Wisconsin.

Reynolds was born in Milwaukee, Wisconsin and graduated from Nathan Hale High School in 1975. In addition to serving in the state senate, Reynolds is the owner of a printing business and an organic-practicing farm. He has five children.

Reynolds was elected to the Wisconsin Senate in 2002 after defeating incumbent Sen. Peggy Rosenzweig, who Reynolds claimed was too liberal, in the Republican primary that April. Before his defeat in 2006, he sat on the Committee on Housing and Financial Institutions, the Committee on Job Creation, Economic Development and Consumer Affairs, the Joint Committee for Review of Administrative Rules, and chaired the Committee on Labor and Election Process Reform.   He was defeated in his bid for re-election by Democrat Jim Sullivan.

Electoral history
2006 Race for Wisconsin State Senate – 5th District
Jim Sullivan (D), 51%
Tom Reynolds (R) (inc.), 49%
2002 Race for Wisconsin State Senate – 5th District
Tom Reynolds (R), 53%
George L. Christenson (D), 47%
2002 Race for Wisconsin State Senate – 5th District Republican Primary
Tom Reynolds (R), 55%
Peggy Rosenzweig (R) (inc.), 45%
1998 Race for U.S. House of Representatives – 4th District
Jerry Kleczka (D) (inc.), 58%
Tom Reynolds (R), 42%
1996 Race for U.S. House of Representatives – 4th District
Jerry Kleczka (D) (inc.), 58%
Tom Reynolds (R), 42%
1996 Race for U.S. House of Representatives – 4th District Republican Primary
Tom Reynolds (R)
J. Mac Davis (R)
1994 Race for U.S. House of Representatives – 4th District
Jerry Kleczka (D) (inc.), 54%
Tom Reynolds (R), 45%

References

External links
 
5th Senate District, Senator Reynolds in the Wisconsin Blue Book (2005–2006)
 
Spivak, Cary and Dan Bice. "Reynolds exhibits signs of quirkiness" Milwaukee Journal Sentinel, September 17, 2005.
"Salad Days: Tom Reynolds, civil unions and not-so-civilized discourse" ' Vital Source Magazine'', October, 2006.
http://www.widigest.com/html/index.html
http://www.bootsandsabers.com

1956 births
Living people
Republican Party Wisconsin state senators
Politicians from Milwaukee
21st-century American politicians